Mark Edward Penabella Escueta (born 9 January 1976) is a Filipino musician and one of the founding members of the Filipino rock band Rivermaya. Escueta has been the only constant member of Rivermaya since its inception in 1994.

Early life
Escueta is the eldest of four siblings. He has two younger brothers and one sister. Escueta finished high school at De La Salle Santiago Zobel School and took Business Administration major in Computer Applications at the De La Salle-College of Saint Benilde. His father is lawyer Eduardo U. Escueta, a retired official of the National Police Commission (NAPOLCOM). Escueta's family originally hails from Tiaong, Quezon.

Musical career

Rivermaya (1994-present)
Escueta began playing drums at the age of 13. He entered the Philippine music industry when he became the drummer of the band Bazurak where one of his bandmates, Nathan Azarcon was the bass player. Azarcon introduced Escueta to another band, Xaga, where Azarcon also played bass. In 1994, he replaced Rome Velayo as drummer and percussionist of Xaga which eventually disbanded and was renamed Rivermaya. He served as drummer of Rivermaya until 2011 when Ryan Peralta replaced him as the drummer. He gradually switch to guitars and also became of the lead vocalists of the band (along with Mike Elgar and later Nathan Azarcon). 
When Peralta left in May 2018, Escueta returned to playing drums permanently for the first time since 2011.

On his birthday at January 9, 2016, he re-united with his former Rivermaya co-members, Perf de Castro, Nathan Azarcon and Rico Blanco for a "secret mini semi-reunion", following de Castro's gig at 19 East, Taguig.

Other musical interests
Escueta is also the former drummer of the short-lived band, Planet Garapata formed by Eraserheads drummer, Raimund Marasigan in 1996.

Personal life
Escueta married singer-actress Jolina Magdangal on 21 November 2011. The two have kids named Pele and Vika.

Discography
Rivermaya
 Rivermaya (1994)
 Trip (1996)
 Atomic Bomb (1997)
 It's Not Easy Being Green (1999)
 Free (2000)
 Tuloy ang Ligaya (2001)
 Between the Stars and Waves (2003)
 You'll Be Safe Here (EP) (2005)
 Isang Ugat, Isang Dugo (2006)
 Bagong Liwanag (EP) (2007)
 Buhay (2008)
 Closest Thing to Heaven (2009)
 Panatang Makabanda (2013)
 Sa Kabila ng Lahat (2017)

References

De La Salle University alumni
21st-century Filipino musicians
Living people
1976 births
Musicians from Quezon
Rivermaya members